Charlie Staines (born 4 October 2000) is a Samoan international rugby league footballer who plays as a er or  for the Wests Tigers in the NRL (National Rugby League).

He previously played with the Penrith Panthers, with whom he won the 2022 NRL Grand Final.

Background
Staines was born in Forbes, New South Wales to Shane and Lisa Staines and was educated at Forbes High School. He played his junior rugby league for the Forbes Magpies before being signed by the Penrith Panthers. Staines is of Samoan descent through his grandfather.

Playing career

2020
On 11 July, Staines made his début in round 9 of the 2020 NRL season for Penrith against Cronulla-Sutherland Sharks. He went on to score four tries, only the sixth player since 1908 to score four or more tries on debut and the first player since 2008.

On 13 July, Staines was stood down by Penrith after breaking strict Coronavirus protocols. Staines had hosted a party at his residence where ten people were invited including members of his family.

In round 12, Staines scored two tries as Penrith defeated Manly 42-12 at Brookvale Oval.  Staines became the first player in 83 years to score six tries from the opening two games in his career.

2021
In round 5 of the 2021 NRL season, Staines scored two tries for Penrith in a 30-10 victory over Canberra.

In round 9 against Cronulla-Sutherland, he scored a hat-trick in a 48-0 victory.

In round 10, he scored two tries for Penrith in a 48-12 victory over the Gold Coast.
In round 12, he scored two tries in a 30-4 victory over the bottom placed Canterbury side.

In round 18, he scored two tries for Penrith in their victory over the New Zealand Warriors.
Staines played a total of 21 games for Penrith in the 2021 NRL season but was not selected for Penrith's grand final team which defeated South Sydney to claim their third premiership.

2022
Staines spent most of the 2022 NRL season in the NSW Cup with Ivan Cleary deciding to go with Taylan May and Brian To'o as the preferred wing options.  Staines was called into the Penrith side for the preliminary final against South Sydney as a replacement for the injured May.  Staines later kept his place for the 2022 NRL Grand Final as May had not recovered from his hamstring injury.
Staines played on the wing for Penrith in their grand final victory over Parramatta scoring a try in the second half.
On 20 October, Staines joined the Wests Tigers in a swap deal with Tyrone Peachey.

References

External links

Penrith Panthers profile

2000 births
Living people
Australian rugby league players
Australian sportspeople of Samoan descent
Penrith Panthers players
Wests Tigers players
Rugby league fullbacks
Rugby league players from Forbes, New South Wales
Rugby league wingers
Samoa national rugby league team players